The following is a list of players of the now-defunct St. Louis Bombers professional basketball team.

John Abramovic
Herschel Baltimore
John Barr
Aubrey Davis
Bob Doll
Lonnie Eggleston
Wyndol Gray
Coulby Gunther
Cecil Hankins
Fred Jacobs
Grady Lewis
Johnny Logan
Ed Macauley
Don Martin
Ariel Maughan
Mike McCarron
Bill Miller
George Munroe
Bob O'Brien
Dermie O'Connell
Buddy O'Grady
Johnny Orr
Mac Otten
Easy Parham
Don Putman
Bill Roberts
Red Rocha
Irv Rothenberg
Giff Roux
Otto Schnellbacher
Ralph Siewert
Belus Smawley
Deb Smith
Mike Todorovich
D. C. Wilcutt

References
St. Louis Bombers all-time roster @ basketball-reference.com

National Basketball Association all-time rosters